Enrique Clemente Armand-Ugón (Colonia, Uruguay August 10, 1893 - Montevideo, Uruguay 1984) was an Uruguayan jurist. He served as judge of the International Court of Justice between 1952 and 1961.

Biography 
He graduated as a Lawyer from the University of the Republic in Montevideo. Later he was appointed Judge in the Courts of First Instance (from 1920) and later in a Court of Appeal (from 1938). In 1945, he became a Judge of the Supreme Court of Justice of Uruguay.

He headed the Uruguayan delegation to the third and fifth Session of the United Nations General Assembly in 1948 and 1950.

In February 1952 he was elected Judge of the International Court of Justice (ICJ) in The Hague. In addition, he was appointed judge ad hoc from 1962 to 1964, in the Barcelona Traction, Light and Power Case Company, Limited between Belgium and Spain, at the request of Spain.

References 

 Enrique C. Armand-Ugon. in Arthur Eyffinger, Arthur Witteveen, Mohammed Bedjaoui, La Cour internationale de Justice 1946-1996. Martinus Nijhoff Publishers 1999, ISBN 9-04-110468-2.
 Armand-Ugon, Enrique C. in Ronald Hilton (Ed.): Who's Who in Latin America. Part V: Argentina, Paraguay, and Uruguay. Stanford University Press 1962, ISBN 0-80-470741-3.

 International Court of Justice judges
Uruguayan jurists